Lischka is a German spelling of the Czech surname Liška, meaning "fox". Notable people include:

 Burkhard Lischka (born 1 February 1965), German lawyer and politician (SPD) 
 David Lischka (born 15 August 1997), Czech professional footballer
 Hans Lischka (born July 26, 1943), Austrian computational theoretical chemist 
 Kurt Lischka (16 August 1909 – 16 May 1989), German SS official, Gestapo chief and commandant of the Security
 Lutz Lischka (born 30 January 1944), Austrian judoka
 Vera Lischka (born 1 May 1977), Austrian breaststroke swimmer

See also
 

German-language surnames
Surnames of Czech origin
Surnames from nicknames
Germanized Slavic family names